Santiago Llano Grande is a town and municipality in Oaxaca in south-western Mexico. The municipality covers an area of  km². 
It is located in the Jamiltepec District in the west of the Costa Region.

References

Municipalities of Oaxaca